Hatase Buemon was a Japanese potter. He was the son of Hatase Jūbei.  Hatase Jūbei worked for the famed Nabeshima Katsushige (1580–1657) who was the lord of the Saga Domain.

Nabeshima opened the first porcelain kiln in the Arita area of Iwatani Kawachi, soon he moved the kiln to Minamikawara. Nabeshima decided to move the Minamikawara kiln due to the close proximity of his rival land owners in Nagasaki, Hirado and Omura.  He feared his closely guarded secret of making fine porcelain was in jeopardy.  He moved the clan to what is still known as Okawachiyama to get away from Hiradohan and Omurahan.  Once there Katsushige Nabeshima decided to gather many special workers for his kiln.  He gathered a total of 31 of the best artists to work in his kilns.  Among those commissioned to work for Nabeshima were Kakiemon, Iaemon, Genemon and Hatase Jūbei. They were hired to make special porcelain pieces for the Emperor and Shōgun. Hatase Jūbei late in life adopted a son from Shibata.

Biography
Buemon Hatase was a child of the adopted son of, or the son of, Hatase Jūbei. In 1871 things in Japan were starting to change.  They were stopping the han system and how land was controlled. During this time many potters stopped making porcelain.  Buemon Hatase wanted to take over the Nabeshima kiln owned by the Nabeshima Clan.  He bought the kiln and started gathering the same people that worked for the Nabeshima kilns.  He took the top artists to work at his kiln.  This act of aggression caused many problems for Hatase.

Buemon Hatase was trained by the lineage of original Nabeshima porcelain masters.  He was also a carver by trade and kiln owner.  He was only in business for a short time.  During his time at the Nabeshima kiln he produced some of the highest quality and unique pieces to ever come from Nabeshima. Most pieces are a tan/brown in color, high relief, carved Sansui which is modeled after Chinese water, mountain and landscape pictures the Japanese call Sansui ga. It is unknown if Buemon Hatase is the son or grandson of Hatase Jūbei.  What is known is that Seiko company was the company that eventually took over the kiln.

It is also known that Shibata Senpei and more famous Mitsutake Hikoshichi were both trained by Buemon and worked for him after he bought the kiln.  Mitsutake Hikoshichi was displayed at the Tokyo National Museum in 2007. Both Mitsutake Hikoshichi and Shibata Senpei were hired to make only the most beautiful and precious items for the Emperor.  Buemon made very few pieces of his own and it is quite possible the pieces showing his name may have been made by Hikoshichi or Senpei. Most of Buemon's pieces are located in Arita, Mikawa and Takeo.  Most of them have never been sold as the price of each piece is so high.  The average prices are between $15,000-$25,000 on the current market which most Japanese people cannot afford.  Within the collection there are ten known pieces most of which are of the tan/brown carved extremely high relief porcelain done in the sansui style.  There are two known pieces of pure white Buddhist-style statues one of which is damaged.  There is a dragon piece that has been lost which was last located in Takeo at an antique shop that is now closed.  Further history is that Buemon trained his son Nao or Naotaro who took over his technique, then Naotaro taught his son Keishichi or Keihichi.

Japanese potters
Year of death missing
Year of birth missing